Galik is a surname of Slavic origin, being a pet form of the personal name Gal. Notable people with the surname include:

Branislav Gálik (born 1973), Slovak former professional tennis player
Denise Galik (born 1950), American actress
Jani Galik (born 1984), Czech football player
Martin Gálik (born 1979), Slovak professional ice hockey player
Miroslav Gálik (born 1990), Slovak footballer
Svatoslav Galík (1938-2019), Czechoslovak competitive orienteer

See also
Galik alphabet, an extension to the Mongolian script